Enga Ooru Kavakkaran is a 1988 Indian Tamil language film, directed by  T. P. Gajendran and produced by Kalyani Murugan. The film stars Ramarajan, Gautami, M. N. Nambiar and T. P. Gajendran in lead roles. The film was a commercial success and ran for more than 100 days.

Plot 
A young and beautiful woman falls in love with her bodyguard. However, they must overcome many challenges in order to be together.

Cast 
Ramarajan as Kanthaya
Gautami as Poovayi
M. N. Nambiar as Pandimuni Devar
Senthamarai as Ramaswamy Devar
T. P. Gajendran
S. S. Chandran as Senthil Father
Sangili Murugan as Sikandar Bai Tea shop owner
Senthil as Senthil Kumaran
Ganthimathi as Muthammal
Usilai Mani as Mani
Kovai Sarala as Sarasu
Y. Vijaya
Babloo Prithiveeraj as Thief
G. M. Sundar as Thief

Soundtrack 
The music was composed by Ilaiyaraaja.

References

External links 
 

1990s Tamil-language films
1998 films
Films directed by T. P. Gajendran
Films scored by Ilaiyaraaja